The equestrian events at the 2000 Summer Olympics in Sydney included dressage, eventing, and show jumping. All three disciplines had both individual and team competitions.

Event summary

Medals

Officials
Appointment of officials was as follows:

Dressage
  Mary Seefried (Ground Jury President)
  Eric Lette (Ground Jury Member)
  Jan Peeters (Ground Jury Member)
  Axel Steiner (Ground Jury Member)
  Volker Moritz (Ground Jury Member)

Jumping
  Jan-Willem Körner (Ground Jury President)
  Graham Davey (Ground Jury Member)
  Peter Herchel (Ground Jury Member)
  Leonidas Georgopoulos (Ground Jury Member)
  Jennifer Millar (Technical Delegate)

Eventing
  Frederik Obel (Ground Jury President)
  Jean Scott Mitchell (Ground Jury Member)
  Brian Schrapel (Ground Jury Member)
  Brian Ross (Ground Jury Member)
  Jennifer Millar (Technical Delegate)

References

External links
 Official Olympic Report

 
2000 Summer Olympics events
2000